Desiré D. Dubounet  (born William Charles Nelson; 19June 1951) is an American alternative medicine inventor, filmmaker and performer currently living in Budapest. Dubounet developed the pseudoscientific Electro Physiological Feedback Xrroid, an energy medicine device that is considered to be dangerous to health and has been described as a scam.

Biography 
Dubounet developed the pseudoscientific EPFX device in the late 1980s which supposedly claimed could diagnose and eliminate diseases including AIDS and cancer. The EPFX device is described as balancing "bio-energetic" forces; bio-energetic forces do not exist. Some people died after using the EPFX system instead of seeking or continuing medical care.

In 1992 the United States Food and Drug Administration ordered Dubounet to stop claiming that the EPFX could diagnose or cure diseases, but she did not; in 1996 she was indicted on nine counts of felony fraud, though none were in relation to the EPFX. Dubounet has since left the United States. Dubounet is also involved in homeopathic medicine; she received a patent for a process for manufacturing homeopathic "remedies" in 1997. At least 10,000 EPFX devices have been sold in the United States.

Dubounet lives in Budapest, and performs at the nightclub Bohemian Alibi. and produced and starred in the  English-Hungarian comedy The Story of F***. Dubounet also directed the erotic comedy Paprika Western.

References

External links 
 Archived website
 Official site

1951 births
American homeopaths
American expatriates in Hungary
Radionic practitioners
Living people
American transgender people
Transgender women